Kenneth Binyavanga Wainaina (18 January 1971 – 21 May 2019) was a Kenyan author, journalist and 2002 winner of the Caine Prize for African Writing. In 2003, he was the founding editor of Kwani? literary magazine. In April 2014, Time magazine included Wainaina in its annual Time 100 as one of the "Most Influential People in the World".

Early life and education 
Binyavanga Wainaina was born on 18 January 1971 in Nakuru in Rift Valley Province, Kenya.  He attended Moi Primary School in Nakuru, Mangu High School in Thika, and Lenana School in Nairobi. He later studied commerce at the University of Transkei in South Africa, where he went to live in 1991. He completed an MPhil in Creative Writing at the University of East Anglia in 2010.

His debut book, a memoir entitled One Day I Will Write About This Place, was published in 2011. In January 2014, in response to a wave of anti-gay laws passed in Africa, Wainaina publicly announced that he was gay, first writing an essay that he described as a "lost chapter" of his 2011 memoir entitled "I am a Homosexual, Mum", and then tweeting: "I am, for anybody confused or in doubt, a homosexual. Gay, and quite happy."

Career 

Following his education, Wainaina worked in Cape Town for some years as a freelance food and travel writer.

In July 2002 he won the Caine Prize for his short story "Discovering Home" (the judges being Ahdaf Soueif, Margaret Busby, Jason Cowley and Abdulrazak Gurnah). Wainaina was the founding editor of Kwani?, the literary magazine in East Africa that sprung out of an artistic revolution that started in 2002. Established in 2003, Kwani? has since become an important source of new writing from Africa; Yvonne Owuor also wrote for the magazine and won the Caine Prize in 2003.

Wainaina's satirical essay "How to Write About Africa", published in Granta magazine in 2005, attracted wide attention. Wainaina summed up the way Western media has reinforced stereotypes and pre-existing ideas of Africa by saying their representation was that: "One must treat Africa as if it were one country... [of] 900 million people who are too busy starving and dying and warring and emigrating to read your book."

In 2003, he was given an award by the Kenya Publishers Association for his services to Kenyan literature. He wrote for The EastAfrican, National Geographic, The Sunday Times (South Africa), Granta, The New York Times, Chimurenga and The Guardian (UK).

In 2007, Wainaina was a writer-in-residence at Union College in Schenectady, NY (USA). In the fall of 2008, he was in residence at Williams College, in Williamstown, Massachusetts, where he was teaching, lecturing and working on a novel. He was a Bard Fellow and the director of the Chinua Achebe Center for African Literature and Languages at Bard College.

Wainaina collected more than 13,000 recipes from around Africa and was an expert on traditional and modern African cuisine.

In January 2007, Wainaina was nominated by the World Economic Forum as a "Young Global Leader" – an award given to people for "their potential to contribute to shaping the future of the world." He subsequently declined the award. In a letter to Klaus Schwab and Queen Rania of Jordan, he wrote:

Personal life 
On 1 December 2016, World AIDS Day, Wainaina announced on his Twitter profile that he was HIV positive, "and happy". In 2018, he announced that he would be marrying his long-term partner the following year.

Death 
Wainaina died, aged 48, after a stroke on the evening of 21 May 2019, at Aga Khan Hospital in Nairobi, according to news and family sources. He had experienced several strokes since 2016.

Selected publications 
 "Discovering Home" (short story), g21net, 2001. Reprinted in Discovering Home: A selection of writings from the 2002 Caine Prize for African Writing.
 "An Affair to Dismember" (short story), Wasafiri, Volume 17, Issue 37, 2002.
 "Beyond the River Yei: Life in the Land Where Sleeping is a Disease" (photographic essay; with Sven Torfinn), Kwani Trust, 2004.
 "How To Write About Africa" (article, satire), Granta 92, 2005. As How to Write About Africa, Kwani Trust, 2008, . Reproduced in full in the 40th birthday edition of Granta, 2 May 2019.
 "In Gikuyu, for Gikuyu, of Gikuyu" (article, satire), Granta 103, 2008.
 "How to Write About Africa II: The Revenge", Bidoun, No. 21, Bazaar II, 2010.
 One Day I Will Write About This Place: A Memoir (autobiography); Graywolf Press, 2011, .
 "Viewpoint: Binyavanga on why Africa's international image is unfair", BBC News | Africa, 24 April 2012.
 "I am a homosexual, mum" (essay). Africa is a Country, 19 January 2014. Reprinted in The Guardian, 21 January 2014.
 "A Letter to All Kenyans from Binyavanga Wainaina or Binyavanga wa Muigai" (essay), Brittle Paper, 25 October 2017.

See also 
LGBT rights in Kenya

Notes

External links 

 (unofficial archive of Binyavanga Wainaina's writing)
 Kwani?
 "Discovering Home" Part One Part Two
 "Voices of Kenya's Voters", Interview, BBC News. 
"Kenyan wins African writing prize", BBC News, 16 July 2002.
 Stephanie Bosch Santana, "Exorcizing Afropolitanism: Binyavanga Wainaina explains why 'I am a Pan-Africanist, not an Afropolitan' at ASAUK 2012", Africa in Words, 8 February 2013.
 Qazi Mustabeen Noor, "Binyavanga Wainaina, powerhouse of African literature, dies at 48", Dhaka Tribune, 12 June 2019.
 Geoff Ryman, "One Day This Man Will Get His Just Reward: An Obituary For Binyavanga Wainaina", Srange Horizons, 2019.

1971 births
2019 deaths
21st-century essayists
21st-century Kenyan writers
21st-century LGBT people
21st-century male writers
21st-century memoirists
Alumni of Lenana School
Alumni of Mang'u High School
Alumni of the University of East Anglia
Caine Prize winners
Chevening Scholars
Gay writers
Kenyan essayists
Kenyan journalists
Kenyan LGBT writers
Kikuyu people
Magazine editors
Male essayists
People from Nakuru
People with HIV/AIDS